Constant Ménager (15 April 1889 in Montataire – 19 December 1970 in Amiens) was a French professional road bicycle racer. In 1909, he won the ninth stage of the 1909 Tour de France, and finished 7th in the overall classification.

Major results

1909
Imola-Piacenza-Imola
Tour de France:
Winner stage 9

External links 

Official Tour de France results for Constant Ménager

French male cyclists
1889 births
1970 deaths
French Tour de France stage winners
Sportspeople from Oise
Cyclists from Hauts-de-France